Robert Poyntz or Pointz may refer to:

 Robert Pointz (died 1665), English landowner and politician
 Robert Poyntz (MP died 1439), MP for Gloucestershire
 Robert Poyntz (died 1520), lord of the manor of Iron Acton in Gloucestershire